Best New Artist (最優秀新人アーティストビデオ賞)

Results
The following table displays the nominees and the winners in bold print with a yellow background.

2000s

2010s

See also
MTV Video Music Award for Best New Artist
MTV Europe Music Award for Best New Act

Music awards for breakthrough artist